Shadegg is a surname. Notable people with the surname include:

John Shadegg (born 1949), American politician
Stephen Shadegg (1909–1990), American political consultant, public relations specialist, and author

Americanized surnames